Absolute Greatest is a 2009 compilation album by the British rock band Queen. The album contains 20 of their most famous songs, and is available in several formats, including the single CD edition, a 2 CD special edition featuring audio commentaries by Brian May and Roger Taylor, a 52-page hardback book with the 2 CDs, digital download, and an LP edition box set. Each track has been remastered from the original tapes.

A promotion running on the band's official website, Queen Online, gave fans the opportunity to guess the placings of the tracks on the album and win a prize if their answer was correct (a new track was revealed daily). The prize winner was then chosen in a random selection.

Track listing

Personnel 
Freddie Mercury - lead and backing vocals, piano, guitar, keyboards, synthesizer
Brian May - guitar, backing vocals, keyboards, synthesizer, orchestral arrangements on "Who Wants to Live Forever", co-lead vocals on "I Want It All" and "Who Wants to Live Forever"
Roger Taylor - drums, percussion, keyboards, synthesizer, electronic drums, backing vocals
John Deacon - bass guitar, piano, guitar, keyboards, synthesizer
David Bowie - vocals, hand claps, finger snaps, keyboards on "Under Pressure"
Fred Mandel - synthesizer on "Radio Ga Ga" and "I Want To Break Free"
National Philharmonic Orchestra - strings on "Who Wants To Live Forever"
Michael Kamen - conductor and orchestral arrangements on "Who Wants To Live Forever"

Charts and certifications

Weekly charts

Year-end charts

Certifications

References

External links
 Queen official website: Discography: Absolute Greatest (no lyrics included)
 Television ad (official video)

Queen (band) compilation albums
2009 greatest hits albums
Parlophone compilation albums
Hollywood Records compilation albums
Compilation albums of number-one songs